The Medical City Ortigas is a tertiary care hospital in Pasig, Metro Manila, Philippines. It is the main hospital of The Medical City (TMC) which maintains a network of hospitals and clinics which are mostly based in the Philippines.

History
The Medical City hospital in Ortigas opened as the ABM Sison Hospital in 1967 with a change of hospital management occurring in 1969. The health facility was renamed as "The Medical City" or TMC in 1975. The hospital moved to its current location in Ortigas in 2004.

The hospital was among several hospitals in Metro Manila which catered to COVID-19 patients during the 2020 coronavirus pandemic in the Philippines with the facility exceeding capacity at one point. By April 2020, the hospital is already among the COVID-19 testing centers in the country.

Facilities
The hospital's main facility is located on a 1.5-hectare property along Ortigas Avenue, almost within the business district of Ortigas Center in Pasig, Metro Manila. The two towers are joined by a Podium, bridgeways, and a Medical Arts Tower. The 18 floors of the Medical Arts Tower house 280 doctors' clinics and select commercial spaces, while located within the six-floor Podium are diagnostic and intervention facilities, as well as support and administrative offices.

The hospital also has a three-level basement parking accommodation for over a thousand vehicles. The complex is also equipped with a broad range of security features, an advanced building management system, and biosafety features incorporated into sensitive patient areas.

References

External links
 

Hospitals in Metro Manila
Buildings and structures in Pasig
Ortigas Center
Hospital buildings completed in 1967
1967 establishments in the Philippines
Hospitals established in 1967
20th-century architecture in the Philippines